Lancang may refer to:

Lancang River, in China, upper half of Mekong River
Lancang County, in Yunnan, China
Lancang (ship), a sailing ship from the Malay Archipelago
Lancang train, Laos Railways variant of China Railway CR200J